What Girls Never Say is a 2000 Italian comedy film directed by Carlo Vanzina.

Cast
Irene Ferri as Alice 
Carlotta Miti as Paola 
Sabrina Paravicini as Laura
Martina Colombari as Francesca
Vincenzo Peluso as Gigi Damatto
Gianluca Gobbi as Roberto
Fabio Bonini as Renato
Ettore Bassi as Walter
Walter Nudo as Alberto
Alessandro Zamattio as Tommy
Paolo Calissano as Bini
Marc Tainon as Alunno
Lia Tanzi as Francesca's mother

References

External links

2000 films
Films directed by Carlo Vanzina
2000s Italian-language films
2000 comedy films
Italian comedy films
2000s Italian films